Qualification for the 2013 United States Women's Curling Championship consists of three different paths. Four teams qualified directly through the High Performance Program or the Order of Merit system. The number of the remaining entrants to the national championships will be cut down to six teams through a challenge round held in mid-January.

Qualification system
Teams will qualify to participate in the women's national championship through the High Performance Program, through the World Curling Tour Order of Merit, or through a challenge round.

Automatic qualification
Two spots in the nationals were awarded to two teams on the United States Curling Association's High Performance National Program, established as an invitation-based program for the development of the top curling teams in the United States. The teams qualified through the High Performance Program were those skipped by Laura Roessler, who is filling in for normal skip Cassandra Potter, and Allison Pottinger. Two more spots were awarded to the top two women's teams on the World Curling Tour Order of Merit standings table following the conclusion of the Iron Trail Motors Shoot-Out. If one or both of the top teams already qualified for the nationals through the High Performance Program, the spot or spots would have been awarded to the team with the next highest position on the Order of Merit. The teams qualified through the Order of Merit were those skipped by Erika Brown and Patti Lank.

Challenge round
The remaining six spots in the nationals will be awarded to the teams that earn qualification spots through the challenge round. The challenge round will be held in a triple knockout format, and is an open registration event. The teams that enter the challenge round will be seeded through a strength of field ranking and through a peer ranking. The strength of field ranking will be based on players' participation and performance in national championships and world championships. The seedings will influence the draw of the triple knockout event.

Challenge round
The challenge round for the women's nationals will be held from January 17 to 21 at the Granite Curling Club in Seattle, Washington. Six teams will advance from the challenge round to the nationals.

Teams
The teams are listed as follows:

Knockout Draw Brackets
The draw is listed as follows:

A Event

B Event

C Event

Knockout results
All draw times listed in Pacific Standard Time (UTC-8).

Draw 1
Friday, January 18, 9:00 am

Draw 2
Friday, January 18, 2:00 pm

Draw 3
Friday, January 18, 7:00 pm

Draw 4
Saturday, January 19, 9:00 am

Draw 5
Saturday, January 19, 2:00 pm

Draw 6
Saturday, January 19, 7:00 pm

Draw 7
Sunday, January 20, 9:00 am

Draw 8
Sunday, January 20, 2:00 pm

References

2013 in curling
United States National Curling Championships
Qualification for curling competitions